Albugo laibachii is a species of oomycete, whose genome has recently (2011) been sequenced. It is a plant pathogen of Arabidopsis thaliana. Albugo laibachii also causes the host plant to become more susceptible to other parasites, when it normally would be more resistant, wearing down the host plant's immune system.

See also 
 Albugo (genus)
 Albugo comparative genomics

References 

Water mould plant pathogens and diseases
Albuginaceae